This is the discography of American rock and roll band the Crickets.

Albums

Studio albums

Compilation albums

EPs

Singles

See also
 Buddy Holly discography

Notes

References

Discographies of American artists
Rock music group discographies